The One and Only or One and Only may refer to:

Books
 The One and Only, a novel by Emily Giffin

Film and television
 The One and Only (1978 film), an American film directed by Carl Reiner
 The One and Only (1999 film), a Danish film directed by Susanne Bier
 The One and Only (2002 film), a British film directed by Simon Cellan Jones
 The One and Only..., a British television special series from 2012 to 2015
 The One and Only (British TV series), a 2008 British TV talent show for tribute acts
 The One and Only (South Korean TV series), a 2021 South Korean television series

Music

Albums
 The One and Only (Lefty Frizzell album), 1959
 The One and Only (Waylon Jennings album), 1967
 The One and Only (Gladys Knight & the Pips album), 1978
 The One and Only (Plankeye album), 1997
 The One & Only (Jo Stafford album), 1997
 The One and Only (Kirsty MacColl album), 2001 compilation album
 The One and Only (Lil Wyte album), 2007
 One and Only (Miho Nakayama album), 1987
 One and Only (album), a 2002 album by Big Daddy Weave
 The One and Only the American title of Chesney Hawkes 1991 album Buddy's Song
 The One and Only, a 1983 posthumously released album by Billy Fury

Songs
 "The One and Only", a song by Kasey Cisyk from the film 1978 The One and Only
 "One and Only" (Adele song), on the 2011 album 21
 "The One and Only" (song), a 1991 song written by Nik Kershaw and recorded by Chesney Hawkes
 "The One and Only", a song by Snoop Dogg from his 2002 album Paid tha Cost to Be da Boss
 "One and Only", a song by Queensrÿche on their album Empire (1990)
 "One and Only", a song by Kruder & Dorfmeister from the album Conversions: A K&D Selection (1996)
 "One and Only", a song by Mary Black from Shine (1997)
 "One and Only", a song mixed by Turin Brakes featuring Gillian Welch on the album Late Night Tales: Turin Brakes (2004)
 "One and Only", a song by Mariah Carey from The Emancipation of Mimi (2005)
 "One and Only", a song by Barenaked Ladies from their albums Barenaked Ladies Are Me (2006) and Barenaked Ladies Are Men (2007)
 "One and Only", a song by Timbaland with Fall Out Boy from the Timbaland album Shock Value (2007) and the Fall Out Boy album Live in Phoenix (2008)
 "One and Only", a song by Nelly from Brass Knuckles (2008)
 "One and Only", a song by Adele on her album 21 (2011)
 "One and Only", a song by Rend Collective on their album As Family We Go (2015)
 "One and Only", a song by Band-Maid on their album World Domination (2018)
 "One and Only (My Boo)", a song by DJ Kay Slay and Greg Street on their album The Champions: North Meets South (2006)
 "One & Only", a song by Deep Obsession from Infinity (1999)
 "One & Only", a song by The Rasmus from Into (2001)
 "One & Only", a song by Loona from Go Won (2018)
 "Tsumetai Kaze to Kataomoi / Endless Sky / One and Only", a J-pop song by Morning Musume '15 (2015)

See also
 My One and Only (disambiguation)
 The Only One (disambiguation)